The Cleveland Open is a professional tennis tournament played on indoor hard courts. It is currently part of the ATP Challenger Tour. It is held annually in Cleveland, United States since 2019.

Past finals

Singles

Doubles

See also
 Tennis in the Land

External links
Official website

ATP Challenger Tour
Hard court tennis tournaments in the United States
Sports competitions in Cleveland
Recurring sporting events established in 2019
Tennis in Cleveland